The 57th Street station is a station on the IND Sixth Avenue Line of the New York City Subway. Located at the intersection of 57th Street and Sixth Avenue (Avenue of the Americas) in Manhattan, it is served by the F train at all times and the <F> train during rush hours in the peak direction. North of the station, the Sixth Avenue Line turns east and becomes the IND 63rd Street Line.

First announced in 1962, the 57th Street station was opened on July 1, 1968, at the cost of $13.2 million. The station was a terminal station until 1989, after which all service was extended to 21st Street–Queensbridge. The station was temporarily served by shuttle trains in the 1990s during the 63rd Street Line's reconstruction. From July to December 2018, the station was closed for an extensive five-month renovation.

History

Construction and 20th century 

The station was built as part of the Chrystie Street Connection, which expanded train capacity on the Sixth Avenue Line. The Sixth Avenue extension to the new terminal at 57th Street was announced in 1962. The next year, the contract to construct the IND Sixth Avenue Line between 52nd and 58th Streets, including the 57th Street station, was awarded to Slattery Construction Company for $7.5 million. Construction of the spur ultimately cost $13.2 million.

The 57th Street station opened on July 1, 1968, as one of two stations added during construction of the Chrystie Street Connection, the other being Grand Street. The opening of the station was celebrated by a 300-guest lunch on the platform on June 27, which was attended by Deputy Mayor Robert W. Sweet; MTA Chairman William J. Ronan; and Avenue of the Americas Association president Eyssell. The new station was intended to serve the new residential and commercial developments being built in the immediate area. Upon its opening, the 57th Street station acted as the terminus of two services, the B during rush hours and KK during off-peak hours. The KK was renamed the K in 1974 and eliminated in 1976. From 1978 to 1990, this station was also served by the JFK Express service to the eponymous airport.

When the north side of the Manhattan Bridge was closed for construction from 1986 to 1998 and again from July to December 2001, this station was only served by a shuttle train along Sixth Avenue, which traveled to Grand Street. Starting in 1988, this station was served by Q trains on weekdays, B trains on weekday evenings and weekends, and F trains during late nights. This was the terminal for all services until the IND 63rd Street Line to 21st Street–Queensbridge opened on October 29, 1989. Late night F-train service was replaced by a shuttle in 1997. Since December 2001, when the 63rd Street Tunnel Connector opened in Queens, the F route has served this station at all times, simultaneous with the withdrawal of all other services from the 63rd Street Line.

Renovations 
Under the 2015–2019 MTA Capital Plan, the station underwent a complete overhaul as part of the Enhanced Station Initiative and was entirely closed for several months. Updates included cellular service, Wi-Fi, USB charging stations, interactive service advisories and maps. In January 2018, the NYCT and Bus Committee recommended that Judlau Contracting receive the $125 million contract for the renovations of 57th and 23rd Streets on the IND Sixth Avenue Line; 28th Street on the IRT Lexington Avenue Line, and 34th Street–Penn Station on the IRT Broadway–Seventh Avenue Line and IND Eighth Avenue Line. However, the MTA Board temporarily deferred the vote for these packages after city representatives refused to vote to award the contracts. The contract was put back for a vote in February, where Judlau's contract was ultimately approved. The station was closed for renovations on July 9, 2018, and reopened on December 19, 2018.

In June 2021, Turkish developer Sedesco released plans for a  supertall skyscraper at 41-47 West 57th Street, within the nearby Billionaires' Row. The developer plans to construct two elevators—one between the street and the mezzanine, and one between the mezzanine and the platform—at the 57th Street station to make it compliant with the Americans with Disabilities Act of 1990. In exchange, Sedesco would receive additional floor area for its skyscraper as part of the MTA's Zoning for Accessibility program. The plans were confirmed in December 2021, and construction is expected to begin in 2022. The elevator between the street and the mezzanine will be constructed on the southwestern corner of 56th Street and Sixth Avenue. The project will be funded by Sedesco.

Station layout 

The 57th Street station contains two tracks and a single island platform serving both tracks. The station stretches from 55th Street to 58th Street. The station walls are plain white, with "57th St" stenciled on long, narrow tiles along the wall.

Prior to the 2018 renovation of the station, the "Next Train" indicator lights still hung from the platform ceiling, dating from the period when the station was a terminal two decades prior. There is an unused tower and crew area at the southern end of the platform.

The station contains a bronze plaque of Colonel John T. O'Neill, a former chief engineer of the New York City Transit Authority.

Exits
There are eight street staircases spread on both sides of Sixth Avenue from 56th to 57th Streets. Before the station's renovation, these entrances had an unusual design compared to older stations, with lit posts reading "SUBWAY" on their side rather than the lighted red-or-green globes typical to other station entrances. The station's exits are distributed as follows:
 One stair, NW corner of 6th Avenue and 57th Street
 One stair, NE corner of 6th Avenue and 57th Street
 One stair, SW corner of 6th Avenue and 57th Street
 Two stairs, east side of 6th Avenue between 56th and 57th Streets
 One stair, NW corner of 6th Avenue and 56th Street
 One stair, SW corner of 6th Avenue and 56th Street
 One stair, SE corner of 6th Avenue and 56th Street

During the 57th Street station's renovation, glass barrier fences, next-train arrival "countdown clocks", and digital neighborhood wayfinding maps were  installed around all of the exit stairs at street level, similar to at other stations renovated as part of the Enhanced Station Initiative. The two exits at the southern corner of 56th Street also received canopies similar to other Enhanced Station Initiative stations.

Notable places nearby

The 57th Street station is within one block of numerous notable locations. Attractions to the west include:

111 West 57th Street
130 and 140 West 57th Street studio buildings
165 West 57th Street
1345 Avenue of the Americas
Carnegie Hall
Carnegie Hall Tower
CitySpire Center
Metropolitan Tower
New York City Center
One57
Parker New York and The Quin hotels
Russian Tea Room

Attractions to the east include:

712 Fifth Avenue
Bergdorf Goodman Building
Fifth Avenue Presbyterian Church
Houses at 10, 12, 17, 26, and 30 West 56th Street; 46 West 55th Street
Peninsula Hotel
Rockefeller Apartments
Solow Building

In addition, the New York Hilton Midtown is one block south, and the Trump Parc and Hotel St. Moritz are one block north.

References

External links

 
 The Subway Nut – 57 Street 
 Station Reporter — F Train
 57th Street entrance from Google Maps Street View
 56th Street entrance from Google Maps Street View
 Platform from Google Maps Street View

IND Sixth Avenue Line stations
Sixth Avenue
New York City Subway stations in Manhattan
Railway stations in the United States opened in 1968
Midtown Manhattan
57th Street (Manhattan)